Umar Marvi or Marui, is a folktale from Sindh, Pakistan about a village girl Marvi Maraich, who resists the overtures of a powerful King and the temptation to live in the palace as a queen, preferring to be in simple rural environment with her own village folk.

The story also appears in Shah Jo Risalo and forms part of seven popular tragic romances from Sindh, Pakistan. The other six tales are Sassui Punnhun, Sohni Mehar, Lilan Chanesar, Noori Jam Tamachi, Sorath Rai Diyach and Momal Rano commonly known as the Seven Queens of Sindh, or the Seven heroines of Shah Abdul Latif Bhittai.

Folklore
The story of Umar Marvi is that Marvi was a young Thari girl abducted by then-ruler of Amarkot, Umar, who wanted to marry her because of her beauty. Upon her refusal she was imprisoned in the historic Umerkot Fort for several years. Because of her courage, Marvi is regarded as a symbol of love for one's soil and homeland.

In popular culture

 Pakistan Television Corporation ran a serial adaptation called Marvi in 1993. The series depicts the story of Marvi and Umar in a modern setting. Ghazal Siddique played the title role, while Hassam Qazi played Umer.
 Umar Marvi is a Pakistani film in adapted from this folktale, produced by Syed Hussain Ali Shah Fazlani, directed by Shaikh Hassan and starring Fazlani himself, Nighat Sultana, Noor Mohammed Charlie and Bibbo. Released on March 12, 1956, it was the first-ever Sindhi-language feature film made in Pakistan.
Umar Marui, is a Sindhi play by Indian writer Ram Panjwani.

See also
 Sindhi folklore
 Shah Abdul Latif Bhittai

Further reading
Baloch, N. A. 1976. Umar Marvi (in Sindhi). Jamshoro: Sindhi Adabi Board.
Chapter on Marui  from the book Tarikh i Tahiri written by the author Mir Tahir Muhammad Nasyani

References

External links
 "Umer Maruee: A Symbol of Patriotism". MuseIndia, 39, Sept.-Oct. 2011.
 Sur Marvi, by Shah Abdul Latif Bhittai (Sindhi).
 Sur Marvi (translated into English by Elsa Kazi).
 Drama Adaptation of Umar Marvi (Urdu)

Love stories
Sindhi folklore
Culture of Sindh
Pakistani literature
Pakistani folklore
Fictional duos
Shah Jo Risalo